The 2007 SWAC men's basketball tournament was held March 7–10, 2007, at Bill Harris Arena in Birmingham, Alabama. Jackson State defeated , 81–71 in the championship game. The Tigers received the conference's automatic bid to the 2007 NCAA tournament as No. 16 seed in the Midwest Region.

Bracket and results

References

2006–07 Southwestern Athletic Conference men's basketball season
SWAC men's basketball tournament